The Castello di Bereguardo is a medieval castle located on Via Castello 2 in the town of Bereguardo, Province of Pavia, region of Lombardy, Italy.

History
The castle, also called the Castello Visconteo of Bereguardo, was built in the first half of the 14th century, commissioned by Luchino Visconti to present a defense to the western borders of the Milan. It was also used as a winter residence and hunting lodge by Galeazzo II Visconti.

By the 15th century some refurbishment was pursued by Filippo Maria Visconti, who also constructed the Naviglio di Bereguardo, a canal linking to the Naviglio Grande.

The Duke Francesco I Sforza granted the castle to then Lord of Bereguardo, Giovanni Maruzzi da Tolentino, a captain and counselor to the Duke. In 1648, and it remained in this family's possession till the 18th century. After passing through a number of owners, it was donated in 1897 to the commune by the engineer Giulio Pisa. Presently, it houses city hall and the town library.

Originally, the castle was a square, made of brick, but the northern wing was razed. The southern end maintains a moated bridge and shows the original crenellations. The Eastern end has a bifore or single mullioned window. The castle lost a surrounding wall and the interiors are highly modified.

References

Sources

External links
 Lombardia Beni Culturali - Castello Visconteo - Bereguardo (PV)
 Comune di Bereguardo - Galleria immagini - Castello Visconteo

Houses completed in the 15th century
Buildings and structures in Pavia
Castles in Lombardy